Juan Manuel Gálvez International Airport  is an international airport located on the island of Roatán, in the Caribbean Sea  off the northern coast of Honduras. Roatán is in the Bay Islands Department of Honduras.

The airport serves national and international air traffic of the island, the nearby cities and for the region. The airport is named for Juan Manuel Gálvez (1889-1972), the former president of the Republic of Honduras in 1949–1952. It was known previously as Roatán International Airport.

Location
The airport is located in the western part of Roatán, near the main city of Coxen Hole.

Renovation
In 2013, InterAirports completed an expansion and upgrade of the airport facilities. The expansion included a larger check-in area with coffee shop and cafe, larger waiting area with sitting area and cafe, expansion of the customs and security areas, and renovation of buildings and outdoor areas.

The next phase of the project will be an expansion of the airport's car parks and pick-up and drop-off locations, rental area, and shopping area. In January 2022, the runway extension work will begin, so the airport can pass 3 million passengers per year and accept intercontinental flights.

Runway

Airlines and destinations

Passenger

Statistics

Accidents and incidents
On 18 March 1990, Douglas DC-3A HR-SAZ of SAHSA overran the runway on landing and ended up in the sea. The aircraft, performing a domestic scheduled passenger service, was damaged beyond repair but all 32 people on board escaped.
 On 17 May 2019, a private aircraft crashed while approaching runway 25 from north. The aircraft impacted the waters of the Roatan beach in Bahia Island under unknown circumstances. The aircraft was destroyed during the accident sequence and five occupants on board received fatal injures. One occupant on board initially survived with unspecified injures but later died from the injuries sustained in the crash.
 On January 4 2022, a BAe Jetstream 31 operated by LANHSA, registration HR-AYY, suffered a right-hand main landing gear collapse upon landing on runway 07. The no.2 propeller struck the runway and the aircraft swung off the right side of the runway, coming to rest on soft ground. There were no injuries or fatalities.

See also 
Transport in Honduras
List of airports in Honduras

References

External links

OpenStreetMap - Roatan
SkyVector - Juan Manuel Galvez International Airport

Airports in Honduras
Roatán